I Shot a Man in Vegas is a 1995 film written and directed by Keoni Waxman, and starring John Stockwell and Janeane Garofalo. The movie is a suspense thriller about five friends dealing with a getaway after one of them gunned down another and dumped the corpse into the trunk of their car.

Critical reception
Film critic Kevin Thomas of the Los Angeles Times in his review praised the film, "...this taut psychological drama packs one surprise after another. Storytelling with a camera seems to come naturally for Waxman, who matches an easy visual flair with an equally effective way with actors and dialogue... Waxman has chosen well his cameraman Steven Finestone, endlessly resourceful and dynamic yet fluid, and his composer Shark, whose spare, mood-setting score is superior to many in far more expensive movies."

Cast
John Stockwell as Grant
Janeane Garofalo as Gale
Brian Drillinger as Martin
Noelle Lippman as Amy
David Cubitt as Johnny
Ele Keats as Chick
Todd Cole as Nick
Patrick J. Statham as Cop No. 1
Ellen S. Statham (billed as Ellen Statham) as Cop No. 2
Tyler Patton as Cop No. 3
Shark as The All Nighter (voice)
Wendy Gardner as Lorna Love (voice)
Craig Wasson as Radio Caller (voice)

Soundtrack
The film's score was composed by Wild Colonials guitarist, Shark.
The score piece "Route 15 4:30AM" from the film appeared on the Wild Colonials film music compilation, Reel Life, Vol. 1.
A full soundtrack album is expected late 2022 on Magnetic Memories Recording Co.

References

External links
 I Shot a Man in Vegas at the Internet Movie Database

American thriller films
Films set in the Las Vegas Valley
1995 films
1990s thriller films
Films directed by Keoni Waxman
1990s American films